Yedla C. Simhadri (1941 – 22 May 2021) was an Indian academician and administrator. He has been the vice-chancellor of many Indian universities including Banaras Hindu University, Patna University, Andhra University, and Acharya Nagarjuna University.

Education 
Simhadri obtained a Master's degree in Social work and Bachelor of Laws from Andhra University. Later he was awarded scholarships by Indiana State University in the US for  a Master's degree in criminology and Sociology. He completed his PhD in Sociology from Case Western Reserve University. He obtained his post-doctoral research degree from the Commonwealth Institute, London. He also obtained a degree in Youth Work from West Germany.

Academic career 
In the 80s, Simhadri worked as a Professor of Sociology at Andhra University. He was a visiting professor at a number of universities in India and abroad. He published over half a dozen books and over 50 articles. He also worked for the United Nations, UNESCO, and United Nations University.

He became the vice-chancellor (VC) of Andhra University in 1991 and served there for the next four years. He was appointed the VC of Banaras Hindu University (BHU) in 1997 when the university was suffering from violence within the campus. He stayed in BHU until 2002 and contributed towards making the university campus safer and conducive to academic activities.

Later in that decade, he served as the Vice-Chancellor of Patna University twice - from 2006 to 2008 and 2014–2017.

References 

1941 births
2021 deaths
Indian academic administrators
Vice Chancellors of the Acharya Nagarjuna University
Vice Chancellors of Banaras Hindu University
Academic staff of Patna University
Academic staff of Andhra University
Andhra University alumni
Indiana State University alumni
Case Western Reserve University alumni
Vice-Chancellors of the Andhra University
Deaths from the COVID-19 pandemic in India